Zalu Ab (also Romanized as Zālū Āb and Zālūāb) is a village in Zalu Ab Rural District, in the Central District of Ravansar County, Kermanshah Province, Iran. At the 2006 census, its population was 681, in 166 families.

References 

Populated places in Ravansar County